The Bzyb or Bzipi ( or ; ;) is one of the two largest rivers of Abkhazia, along with the Kodori, and the twelfth longest river in Georgia. The river valley has rich biodiversity of herbaceous garden plants, particularly in the gorge section in the upper reaches where the most prominent and colourful bellflower  with profuse growth of 100 flowers per plant is given the name, the "Queen of the Abkhazian flora". During 1904-1917 it served as the border between Russian Empire's Sukhumi Okrug and Black Sea Governorate.

Etymology
It is significant, that "Bzipi" is a comparatively new name of the river. Until the 1820s it was called "Kapoetis Tskali" (literally meaning "Water of Kapoeti"). This is a Georgian name and comes from the name of the fish "Kapoeti". Fish Kapoeti belongs to the trout-salmon family. This large variety of trout dwells in this river. It has also been said that "Bzyp" is associated with the Georgian name for the box tree (pussy-willow) plant - ბზა (Bza). The main river of Abkhazia flowing near the box-trees or the gorge of Bzyp is called box-tree or Bzipi.

Geography
The Bzyb basin located in the zone of humid subtropics of the Caucasus Mountains. The Bzyb is first among Abkhazia's rivers with respect to length,, and second after the Kodori with respect to average annual discharge,  and drainage basin area, . At its entrance in the mouth of the Black Sea it splits into two estuary channels.

Its valley borders the Bzyb Range, Gagra Range and some other ranges of Caucasus Major. The Bzyb separates Arabika from the adjacent Bzyb Range, an outstanding karst area with many deep caves. An upper tributary of the river is the Jimsa which flows in the area of the mountain of the same name. The Bzyb’ basin has the Lake Ritsa, which forms the headwaters of the Iupshara. A road from the Black Sea to Lake Ritsa runs along this valley.

Southeast of the Bzyb outfall area is the Pitsunda Cape which projects far out into the Black Sea. Seismic data extracted in the region has revealed that valleys on the submarine slope cut several dozen metres into Miocene-Pliocene conglomerates.
This cape was formed over time by the transportation of sediment along the Bzyb and accumulating on the cape. According to the data collected by Mandych in 1967, the Bzyb transports around 170,000 tonnes of course material annually, almost as high as the combined total of the Mzymta and Psou rivers (200,000 tonnes per year). The upper river basin in Northern Abkhazia is home to the Bzyb Abkhaz people (one of the three ethnic groups of Abkhaz), who have their own distinct dialect. Gudaud is another subgroup of Bzyb. The river is used for transportation of logs from the upland forest areas.

The hydropower potential of most significant rivers of the country, the Kodor (Kudry), Bzyb, Kyalasur, Gumista rivers that form the Black Sea basin, has been assessed to be more than over 3.5 million kW.

Flora and fauna

The river valley has a rich biodiversity of flora, right from the mouth of the river at Pitsunda and extending upstream to the Ritsa Lake. The river forming the upper valley is a gorge section of more than  height, with steep rock slopes on both banks. On these slopes, herbaceous plants are found; the most prominent of these plants, among many species found here, is the bellflower Campanula mirabilis which is known by the epithet the "Queen of the Abkhazian flora." Blue flowers from these plants (said to bloom 100 flowers per plant) cover the entire gorge section during the months of June to August. Another plant recently identified near the Ritz Lake is given the name Campanula paradoxa, which “forms a rosette of large leaves with lateral shoots producing inflorescence of white flowers.” Other garden plant species found in the valley are the local bellflowers namely C. albovii and C. dzyschrica.

At the mouth of the Bzyb is the Pitsunda Cape, which has a lake known as the Inkit Lake, which is fed by Bzyb. This lake was once an internal harbour when it was connected to the Black Sea, when the ancient city of Pitiunt was founded; archaeological findings at this place have revealed antiquarian artifacts and foundation of structures. It is also mentioned that an ancient temple existing here got flooded consequent to the lowering of the lake level.

The Bzyb river basin also contains a notable population of fir trees. Significant populations of Darevskia alpina, a species listed as vulnerable by the IUCN, have been recorded in the upper reaches of the Bzyb.

There is also a large Agricultural Experimental Station in the wide part of the Bzyb valley where plant species have been introduced from all parts of the world. Some of the rare collections which have thrived well under the prevailing climatic conditions include the coniferous coastal redwood Sequoia sempervirens and the deodar Cedrus deodara. These are 50-year-old redwoods, which have grown to be  in height.

Recreation and use

Soviet General Secretary Nikita Khrushchev once proposed a major dam and hydroelectric power generation facility on the Bzyb, since his favourite resort was located near the mouth of the river at Pitsunda. However, this proposal was ruled out by his experts who opined that a dam built on the Bzyb would have had catastrophic effects in causing beach erosion at Pitsunda. In the end, the dam was built on the Enguri instead, where the impact upon the coastline was assessed to be considerably less pronounced.

It also ensued, when the Soviet president was staying in Pitsunda resort, that he heard rumours that he was to be deposed. He was summoned from here on 13 October 1964 by the Politburo to Moscow when he was given a charge sheet accusing him of nepotism, corruption and several other criminal issues, which was a way of saying that he was deposed. On 14 October, he resigned and giving his briefcase into his son Sergei's hand told him: "That's it. I'm retired."

The river is popular for kayaking and rafting. The mountainous Ritsa Lake region in the Ritsa reserve of Abkhazia is well known for its wines, grown between forests and mountain rivers. The Abkhaz souvenir varieties of wine include the "Ritsa" and "New Athos," among many other varieties.

Pitsunda Cape at the mouth of the Bzyb has many important landmarks such as the ancient settlement of Pitiunt, a lighthouse, a temple of the 10th century, a museum and an old pine tree maintained from 1926.

See also

References

Rivers of Georgia (country)
Rivers of Abkhazia
Tributaries of the Black Sea